The Hudson Strait links the Atlantic Ocean and the Labrador Sea to Hudson Bay in Canada. This strait lies between Baffin Island and Nunavik, with its eastern entrance marked by Cape Chidley in Newfoundland and Labrador and Resolution Island off Baffin Island. The strait is about 750 km long with an average width of 125 km, varying from 70 km at the eastern entrance to 240 km at Deception Bay.

English navigator Sir Martin Frobisher was the first European to report entering the strait, in 1578. He named a tidal rip at the entrance the Furious Overfall and called the strait Mistaken Strait, since he felt it held less promise as an entrance to the Northwest Passage than the body of water that was later named Frobisher Bay. John Davis sailed by the entrance to the strait during his voyage of 1587. The first European to explore the strait was George Weymouth who sailed 300 nautical miles beyond the Furious Overfall in 1602. The strait was named after Henry Hudson who explored it in 1610 in the ship Discovery, the same ship previously used by George Weymouth in 1602. Hudson was followed by Thomas Button in 1612, and a more detailed mapping expedition led by Robert Bylot and William Baffin in 1616.

The Hudson Strait links the northern seaports of Manitoba and Ontario with the Atlantic Ocean. The Strait could serve as an eastern entrance to the Northwest Passage if it were not for ice in the Fury and Hecla Strait south of western Baffin Island.

Extent
The International Hydrographic Organization defines the limits of the Hudson Strait as follows:

On the West. A line from Nuvuk Point to Leyson Point, thence by the Eastern shore of Southampton Island to Seahorse Point, its Eastern extreme, thence a line to Lloyd Point Baffin Island.

On the North. The South coast of Baffin Island between Lloyd Point and East Bluff.

On the East. A line from East Bluff, the Southeast extreme of Baffin Island, to Point Meridian, the Western extreme of Lower Savage Islands, along the coast to its Southwestern extreme and thence a line across to the Western extreme of Resolution Island, through its Southwestern shore to Hatton Headland, its Southern point, thence a line to Cape Chidley, Labrador.

On the South. The mainland between Cape Chidley and Nuvuk Point.

References

Further reading

 Allard, Michel, Baolai Wang, and Jean A Pilon. 1995. "Recent Cooling Along the Southern Shore of Hudson Strait, Quebec, Canada, Documented from Permafrost Temperature Measurements". Arctic and Alpine Research. 27, no. 2: 157.
 Andrews, J. T., and D. C. Barber1. 2002. "Dansgaard-Oeschger Events: Is There a Signal Off the Hudson Strait Ice Stream?" Quaternary Science Reviews. 21, no. 1-3: 443–454.
 Barr, W. 1994. "The Eighteenth Century Trade between the Ships of the Hudson's Bay Company and the Hudson Strait Inuit". Arctic. 47, no. 3: 236.
 Campbell, N. J. The Oceanography of Hudson Strait. [S.l.]: Atlantic Oceanographic Group, 1958.
 Easton, A. K. Tides of Hudson Strait. Dartmouth, Nova Scotia: Bedford Institute of Oceanography, 1972.
 Gaston, A. J. Seabird Investigations in Hudson Strait Report on Activities in 1980. OLABS Program report. [Canada]: Canadian Wildlife Service, 1981.
 Payne, F. F. Eskimo of Hudson's Strait. Toronto?: s.n.], 1889. 
 2005. "A Sentry at the Atlantic Gateway – An Experimental Mooring Monitors Water Flow Through Strategic Hudson Strait". Oceanus. 44, no. 3: 30.

Straits of Quebec
Straits of Qikiqtaaluk Region
Bodies of water of Baffin Island
Bodies of water of Hudson Bay
Borders of Nunavut
Borders of Quebec
Landforms of Nord-du-Québec